Hypertropha is a moth genus of the family Depressariidae.

Species
 Hypertropha chlaenota Meyrick, 1887
 Hypertropha desumptana (Walker, 1863)
 Hypertropha thesaurella Meyrick, 1880
 Hypertropha tortriciformis (Boisduval & Guenée, 1852)

References

 
Hypertrophinae